Johnny E. Counts, Jr. (February 28, 1939 – February 21, 2004) was a professional football player and running back in the NFL and the Canadian Football League (CFL).

Education and career
Counts was an All-County running back at New Rochelle High School in 1957. He attended the University of Illinois, where he was selected as a Big Ten "Sophomore of the Year" in 1960.

In the 1962 draft of the American Football League, he was selected in round 24 and 189th overall by the New York Giants (then the New York Titans).

He also played in the Canadian Football League for the Hamilton Tiger-Cats and the Toronto Argonauts. He played with the Tiger-Cats from 1964 to 1965, during which he scored a touchdown in the 52nd Grey Cup, in which the BC Lions beat Hamilton 34–24. 53rd Grey Cup champion (1965) He played for the Argonauts in 1966.

References

1939 births
2004 deaths
Sportspeople from New Rochelle, New York
Players of American football from New York (state)
American players of Canadian football
American football running backs
Illinois Fighting Illini football players
New York Giants players
Hamilton Tiger-Cats players
Toronto Argonauts players
New York Titans (AFL) players
New Rochelle High School alumni